is a 2000 action role-playing game developed by FromSoftware for the PlayStation 2 (PS2). It was published by Agetec as launch title for the PS2 in North America and was published in PAL territories by Ubisoft and Crave Entertainment.

IGN gave some praise to the game for its innovations at the time, including its full use of the DualShock 2 controller's buttons and the unique "paper doll" system in which the player's avatar actually visibly wears the armor and clothing assigned to it. But the website said most aspects of the game were fairly "run-of-the-mill" without being egregiously bad. GameSpot criticized the game for its dated visuals and laggy gameplay during battles. The website said that the interesting features do not overshadow the fact that the "core gameplay is awkward and uninteresting".

Gameplay
Evergrace features two main characters, Darius the swordsman and Sharline the homemaker, with two distinctly different storylines and different battle techniques. The game allows players to switch between characters at any save point, and uses an experience system dependent on items and equipment rather than statistical upgrades. Another feature is the Palmira Action System which allows players to improve the physical abilities of their characters by combining specialized crystals with their armaments.

Evergrace also features a bonus dungeon that is named after Shadow Tower, another game by FromSoftware, a company often known for including past game references in their games. The Moonlight Sword, for example, a weapon that originated in their flagship series, King's Field, also appears in Evergrace as well as its follow-up, Forever Kingdom.

Plot

The continent of Edinbury once held the largest and most powerful empire of all time: the Rieubane Empire. This empire was primarily ruled by Morpheus, a powerful magician, and his servants and clients. Morpheus became devoted to studying the Crest, a series of markings on one's hand, and are considered cursed due to the misfortunes that happen to the Crestbearers. Morpheus was fascinated with the Crest and performed several experiments, thus creating the powerful Palmira Armaments and the man-made AI Crest. After capturing a renegade soldier who had the Crest, Morpheus ordered the Empire to invade Toledo, a nearby independent village in the Billiana forest, because they worshiped the Crest and were supposedly a threat to the balance of Rieubane. The Empire would never have agreed with Morpheus if they knew his real reason for invading the Toledans: simply to acquire more test subjects. In the end, the Empire effortlessly crushed Toledo, but as the flames grew higher, the Rieubane Empire, Toledo and the Human Research Lab suddenly and completely disappeared. People came to call Rieubane "the Lost Kingdom", and the land became overgrown with Billiana Trees. Hundreds of years later, four villages once part of the empire banded together to establish the empire of Fontraile, but this was not to last...

Development
Evergrace was developed by FromSoftware and led by producer Masanori Takeuchi. The developer intended Evergrace to be released onto the PlayStation 2 (PS2) in its earliest stages of production. However, with these plans in place, the development team decided to try creating a version for the original PlayStation (PS1). About 50% of the PS1 version's assets including all its music had been completed before it was ultimately cancelled. Despite the PS1 version performing well in the company's quality assurance meetings, many staff members questioned if the project should just transition to Sony's new console. When the decision was made to move the project to the PS2, the programming, modeling, animation, textures, and soundtrack all had to be redone from scratch. As the new console had yet to be released itself and the developer lacked an understanding of its power, development consisted largely of trial-and-error. Takeuchi claimed that many of the ideas the team had could not be realized on the PS1 hardware. The PS2's enhanced processor allowed the implementation of character facial animation, subtle animation for fabric and hair, and more detailed graphics when equipping an avatar. Sharline, who had been cut as playable character in the PS1 version, was reintroduced due the PS2's ability to display more polygons and thus a more realistic female figure.

The soundtrack for Evergrace was created by FromSoftware's in-house band FreQuency and chiefly composed by Kota Hoshino. Prior to the conception of Evergrace, Hoshino wanted to a create unique kind of sound he could keep to himself and he expressed gratitude to the game's developers for allowing him the freedom to express this vision through the game's musical score. Takeuchi had been told that there were very few technical differences between the PS1 and PS2 and with the PS1 soundtrack for Evergrace already completed, he said that the team tried simply inserting this music into the nearly-finished PS2 version. The producer asked the sound team to improve the audio fidelity but they found the songs themselves did not fit the new version, so the music was completely reworked alongside the rest of the game. Hoshino stated that voices are used as the primary "instrument" for the game's sound. Hoshino recorded samples of his own voice and edited them with Soundforge, then recorded more voice samples to create what he considered to be an ethnic sound. Japanese instruments such as the shakuhachi and the shamisen were also added, while all of the percussion was synthesized.

Reception

Evergrace received "mixed" reviews according to the review aggregation website Metacritic. IGN praised the game for its innovations, including its full use of the DualShock controller buttons and the unique "paper doll" system in which the player's avatar actually wears the armor and clothing assigned to it. GameSpot criticized the game for its dated visuals and laggy gameplay during battles. Steven Frost of NextGen said, "Evergraces 32-bit beginnings really hurt its ability to provide a true next-generation experience. Only die-hard RPG fans will have the patience and persistence to finish this adventure." In Japan, Famitsu gave it a score of two sevens, one eight, and one six for a total of 28 out of 40.

According to Famitsu, the game debuted on Japanese sales charts at fifth place, selling 75,083 units. It fell to seventh place the following week, selling an additional 11,886 units. After continuing to fall on the charts, the game sold 134,865 units in the region by the end of 2000.

Notes

References

External links
Evergrace at Agetec
Evergrace at From Software 

2000 video games
Action role-playing video games
Agetec games
Cancelled PlayStation (console) games
Crave Entertainment games
Fantasy video games
FromSoftware games
Kadokawa Dwango franchises
PlayStation 2 games
PlayStation 2-only games
Single-player video games
Ubisoft games
Video games developed in Japan
Video games featuring female protagonists
Video games scored by Kota Hoshino